= Compaq Center =

The Compaq Center was formerly the name of the following locations then sponsored by Compaq:

- Lakewood Church Central Campus in Houston, Texas
- SAP Center in San Jose, California
